This is a list of newspapers in Pennsylvania.

Daily newspapersThis is a list of all daily newspapers in Pennsylvania. For weeklies, please see List of newspapers in Pennsylvania

Altoona Mirror - Altoona
Beaver County Times - Beaver
The Bradford Era - Bradford
Butler Eagle - Butler
Bucks County Courier Times - Langhorne
Bucks County Herald - Lahaska
Centre Daily Times - State College
Citizens' Voice - Wilkes-Barre
Courier-Express - DuBois
The Daily American - Somerset
The Daily Collegian - University Park
The Daily Item - Sunbury
The Daily Local News - West Chester
The Daily News - Huntingdon
The Daily News - McKeesport
The Derrick/The News-Herald - Oil City
Danville News - Danville
Delaware County Daily Times - Upper Darby
Ellwood City Ledger - Ellwood City
Erie Times-News - Erie
The Express - Lock Haven
The Express-Times - Easton
Gettysburg Times - Gettysburg
Gettysburg Connection - Gettysburg
The Herald - Sharon
The Herald-Standard - Uniontown
Indiana Gazette - Indiana
The Intelligencer - Doylestown
Kane Republican - Kane
LNP - Lancaster
The Mercury - Pottstown
Metro - Philadelphia
The Morning Call - Allentown
Morning Times - Sayre
The News-Item - Shamokin
Observer-Reporter - Washington
Philadelphia Daily News - Philadelphia
Philadelphia Front Page News - Philadelphia
The Philadelphia Inquirer - Philadelphia
Philadelphia News - Philadelphia (Russian language)
Philadelphia Tribune - Philadelphia
Pittsburgh Tribune-Review - Pittsburgh
Pocono Record - Stroudsburg
Potter Leader Enterprise - Coudersport
Press Enterprise - Bloomsburg
The Progress - Clearfield
Public Opinion - Chambersburg
Reading Eagle - Reading
Record-Argus - Greenville
The Record Herald - Waynesboro
The Reporter - Lansdale
The Republican & Herald - Pottsville
Ridgway Record - Ridgway
St. Marys Daily Press - Saint Marys
The Sentinel - Carlisle
The Sentinel - Lewistown
Standard-Journal - Milton
Standard-Speaker - Hazleton
Times Herald - Norristown
Times Leader - Wilkes-Barre
Times News - Lehighton
The Times-Tribune - Scranton
The Tribune-Democrat - Johnstown
Titusville Herald - Titusville
Wayne Independent - Honesdale
Wellsboro Gazette - Wellsboro, prior names include: The Wellsboro Agitator
Williamsport Sun Gazette - Williamsport
York Daily Record - York
The York Dispatch - York

Other newspapers 
 American Srbobran - Pittsburgh
 Amerika/America - Philadelphia
 Central Penn Business Journal - Harrisburg
 Centre County Gazette - State College
 Clarion News - larion
 Chestnut Hill Local - Chestnut Hill
 Echo Pilot - Greencastle
 The Elizabethtown Advocate - Elizabethtown
 God's Field/Rola Boza - Scranton
 Jednota - Middletown
 Main Line Times - Ardmore
 Narodna Volia - Scranton
 Narodne Noviny - Pittsburgh
 New Pittsburgh Courier - Pittsburgh
 The News Eagle - Hawley
 The Newville Valley Times-Star - Newville
 Our Town Johnstown - Johnstown
 The Patriot-News - Harrisburg (3x/week)
 Pennsylvania Business Central - State College
 Perry County Times - New Bloomfield
 Philadelphia Business Journal - Philadelphia
 Philadelphia City Paper - Philadelphia
 Philadelphia Weekly - Philadelphia
 Pittsburgh Business Times - Pittsburgh
 Pittsburgh City Paper - Pittsburgh
 Pittsburgh Post-Gazette - Pittsburgh
 Press and Journal - Harrisburg
 The Public Record - Philadelphia
 The Leader Vindicator - New Bethlehem
 The Shippensburg News-Chronicle - Shippensburg
 The Temple News - Philadelphia
 Town and Country - Pennsburg
 The Villager - Moscow
 Wyoming County Examiner - Tunkhannock
 Zajednicar - Pittsburgh

Defunct newspapers

Bristol
Newspapers published in Bristol, Pennsylvania:

 Aurora. General Advertiser. D., Aug. 30-Oct. 19, 1799.

Bustleton
Newspapers published in Bustleton, Pennsylvania:

 Porcupine's Gazette. W., Sept. 6-Oct. 26, 1799.

Carlisle
Newspapers published in Carlisle, Pennsylvania:

 The Carlisle Gazette, and The Western Repository Of Knowledge. W., Aug. 10, 1785-Jan. 1, 1794.
 Kline's Carlisle Weekly Gazette. W., Jan. 8, 1794-Dec. 31, 1800+
 The Telegraphe.. W., Feb. 10, 1795-May 3, 1796.

Chambersburg
Newspapers published in Chambersburg, Pennsylvania:

 Farmer's Register. W., Apr. 18, 1798-Apr. 10, 1799.
 The Franklin Repository. W., Apr. 21, 1796-Dec. 25, 1800+ In 1852 it was purchased by Alexander McClure, who built it into a leading Republican (anti-slavery) paper.

Chestnut Hill
Newspapers published in Chestnut Hill, Pennsylvania:

 Chesnuthiller Wochenschrift. W., Dec. 15, 1790-Aug. 20, 1793.

Doylestown
Newspapers published in Doylestown, Pennsylvania:

 The Farmers' Weekly Journal. W., July 25 (?), 1800+

Easton
Newspapers published in Easton, Pennsylvania:

 American Eagle
 Neuer Unpartheyischer Eastoner Bothe, Und Northampton Kundschafter. W., Aug. (?), 1793-Dec. (?), 1800+

Gettysburg
Newspapers published in Gettysburg, Pennsylvania:
 The Gettysburg Times (1800-today)

Germantown
Newspapers published in Germantown, Pennsylvania:

 Die Germantauner Zeitung. Bi-W., W., Feb. 8, 1785-July 16, 1793.
 Pensylvanische Berichte, Oder, Sammlung Wichtiger Nachrichten Aus Dem Natur- Und Kirchen-Reich. M., S.M., Fortnightly, June 16, 1746-July 1766.

Harrisburg
Newspapers published in Harrisburg, Pennsylvania:

 The Harrisburgh Journal, and The Weekly Advertiser. W., Aug. 26. 1789-(?).
 The Oracle Of Dauphin, and Harrisburgh Advertiser. W., Oct. 20, 1792-Dec. 29, 1800+
 Harrisburg Telegraph, being published in 1874

Lancaster
Newspapers published in Lancaster, Pennsylvania:

 Der Deutsche Porcupein, Und Lancaster Anzeigis-Nachrichten. W., Jan. 3, 1798-Dec. 25, 1799.
 Lancaster Journal. W., June 18, 1794-Dec. 27, 1800+
 Neue Unpartheyische Lancaster Zeitung, Und Anzeigs- Nachrichten. W., Aug. 8, 1787-Nov. 1, 1797 (?).
 The Pennsylvania Packet, Or, The General Advertiser. W., Nov. 29, 1777-June 17, 1778.
 Das Pennsylvanische Zeitungs-Blat, Oder, Sammlung Sowohl Auswartig- Als Einheimischer Neuigkeiten.. W., Feb. 4- June 24, 1778.

Media
Newspapers published in Media, Pennsylvania:
Delaware County American, 1859-?

Norristown
Newspapers published in Norristown, Pennsylvania:

 The Norristown Gazette. W., June 15, 1799 – June 6, 1800.

Northumberland
Newspapers published in Northumberland, Pennsylvania:

 The Sunbury and Northumberland Gazette.. W., Oct. 9(?), 1793-Dec. 27, 1800+

Philadelphia
Newspapers published in Philadelphia, Pennsylvania:

 The American Herald, and General Advertiser. S.W., June 21-July 5, 1784.
 The American Naval and Commercial Register. S.W., Nov. 25- Dec. 19, 1795.
 The American Star. L'Etoile Americaine. TW., W., Apr. 1- May 3, 1794.
 The American Star, Or, Historical, Political, Critical, and Moral Journal. T.W., Feb. 1-Mar. 25, 1794.

 The American Weekly Mercury. W., Dec. 22, 1719-May 22 (?), 1746.
 Aurora. General Advertiser. D., Nov. 8, 1794-Dec. 1800+
 Bache's Philadelphia Aurora. T.W., June 14, 1797- Mar. 6/7, 1800.
 Carey's Pennsylvania Evening Herald. S.W., Jan. 25- Feb. 8, 1785.
 Carey's Pennsylvania Evening Herald and American Monitor. S.W., Feb. 12-Mar. 22, 1785.
 Carey's United States' Recorder. T.W., Jan. 23-Aug. 30, 1798.
 Claypoole's American Daily Advertiser. D., Jan. 1, 1796- Sept. 30, 1800.
 The Complete Counting House Companion. W., Mar. 19, 1785(?)-Oct. 30, 1790.
 The Constitutional Diary and Philadelphia Evening Advertiser. D., Dec. 2, 1799-Feb. 3, 1800.
 Country Porcupine. T.W., Mar,. 3/5, 1798-Aug. 27/28, 1799.
 Courier De l'Amerique. S.W., July 27-Oct. 26, 1784.
 Courier De l'Amerique. S.W., Dec. 4, 1792-Feb. 22, 1793.
 Courrier Francais. D.,T.,W. Apr. 15, 1794-July 3, 1798.
 The Daily Advertiser. D., Feb. 7-July 4, 1797.
 The Dessert To The True American. W., July 14, 1798- Aug. 19, 1799.
 Dunlap and Claypooles American Daily Advertiser. D., Dec. 9, 1793-Dec. 31, 1795.
 Dunlap's American Daily Advertiser. D., Jan. 1, 1791- Dec. 7, 1793.
 Dunlap's Pennsylvania Packet, Or, The General Advertiser. W., Oct. 25, 1773-Sept. 9, 1777.
 The Evening Chronicle. T.W., S.W., May 5-Nov. 7, 1787.
 The Evening Chronicle, Or, The Philadelphia Advertiser. T.W., Feb. 6-May 3, 1787.
 The Federal Gazette and Philadelphia Daily Advertiser. D., Apr. 1, 1790-Dec. 31, 1793.
 The Federal Gazette, and Philadelphia Evening Post. D., Oct. 1, 1788-Mar. 31, 1790.
 The Federal Gazette, and The Philadelphia Evening Post. T.W., Mar. 8-Apr. 24, 1788.
 Finlay's American Naval and Commercial Register. S.W., Dec. 28, 1795-May 1, 1798.
 The Freeman's Journal, Or, The North-American Intelligencer. W., Apr. 25, 1781-May 16, 1792.
 Gale's Independent Gazetteer. S.W., Sept. 16, 1796- Sept. 12, 1797.
 Gazette of the United States. S.W., Nov. 3, 1790-Sept. 18, 1793.
 Gazette Of The United States. D., July 1, 1795 – June 30, 1796.
 Gazette of the United States, & Daily Advertiser. D., June 28-Dec. 31, 1800+
 Gazette of the United States and Daily Evening Advertiser. D., June 12, 1794 – June 30, 1795.
 Gazette of the United States and Evening Advertiser. D., Dec. 11, 1793-June 11, 1794.
 Gazette of the United States, & Philadelphia Daily Advertiser. D., July 1, 1796 – June 27, 1800.
 Gemeinnutzigige Philadelphische Correspondenz. W., May 2, 1781-Sept. 24, 1790.
 General Advertiser. D., Aug. 16, 1791-Nov. 7, 1794.
 General Advertiser, and Political, Commercial, Agricultural and Literary Journal. D., Oct. 1, 1790-Aug. 15, 1791.
 Der General-Postbothe An Die Deutsche Nation In Amerika. S.W., Jan. 5, 1790-June 29, 1790.
 Heinrich Millers Pennsylvanisher Staatsbote. S.W, W., May 23, 1775 – May 26, 1779.
 The Independent Gazetteer. S.W., Jan. 11, 1794-Sept. 10, 1796.
 The Independent Gazetteer, and Agricultural Repository. W., Jan. 16, 1790-Jan. 4, 1794.
 The Independent Gazetteer, Or, The Chronicle Of Freedom. W., S.W., D., Apr. 13, 1782-Jan. 9, 1790.
 The Level Of Europe and North America.. Oct. 1, 1794.
 The Level Of Europe and North America, Or, The Observer's Guide. Feb. 9, 1795-Jan. 27, 1796.
 The Mail, Or, Claypoole's Daily Advertiser. D. June 1, 1791-Sept. 30, 1793.
 National Gazette. S.W., Oct. 31, 1791-Oct. 26, 1793.
 Neue Philadelphische Correspondenz. S.W., W., Oct. 1, 1790-Nov. 20, 1792.
 The New World. D., Oct. 24, 1796-Aug. 16, 1797.
 The New World, Or, The Morning and Evening Gazette. Twice Daily, Aug. 15, 1796-Oct. 24, 1796.
 The Pennsylvania Chronicle, and Universal Advertiser. W., Jan. 26, 1767-Feb. 8, 1774.
 The Pennsylvania Evening Herald: and The American Monitor. S.W., Mar. 26, 1785-May 27, 1786.
 The Pennsylvania Evening Post. T.W., S.W., Jan. 24, 1775- July 30, 1781.
 The Pennsylvania Evening Post, and Daily Advertiser. D., May 30, 1783-Oct. 26, 1784.
 The Pennsylvania Evening Post, and Public Advertiser. D., Aug. 3, 1781-May 19, 1783.
 The Pennsylvania Gazette. W., Oct. 2, 1729-Sept. 10, 1777; Dec. 20, 1777-June 20, 1778; Nov. 13, 1782-Dec. 24, 1800+
 The Pennsylvania Gazette, and Weekly Advertiser. W., Jan. 5, 1779-Nov. 6, 1782.
 The Pennsylvania Herald, and General Advertiser. S.W., T.W., May 31, 1786-Feb. 14, 1788.
 The Pennsylvania Journal, and The Weekly Advertiser. W., Jan. 30, 1766-Sept. 1777.
 The Pennsylvania Journal and The Weekly Advertiser. W., S.W., May 17, 1780-Sept. 18, 1793.
 The Pennsylvania Journal, and Weekly Advertiser. W., June 13, 1751-Jan. 23, 1766.
 The Pennsylvania Journal and Weekly Advertiser. W., Dec. 23, 1778-May 10, 1780.
 The Pennsylvania Journal, Or, Weekly Advertiser. W., Dec. 21, 1742-June 6, 1751.

 The Pennsylvania Ledger, Or, The Philadelphia Market-Day Advertiser. S.W., Dec. 3, 1777-May 23, 1778.
 The Pennsylvania Ledger, Or, The Virginia, Maryland, Pennsylvania, & New-Jersey Weekly Advertiser. W., Jan. 28, 1775-Nov. 30, 1776.
 The Pennsylvania Ledger, Or, The Weekly Advertiser. W., Oct. 10-Nov. 26, 1777.
 The Pennsylvania Mercury, and Philadelphia Price-Current. T.W., W., July 21, 1791-Mar. 1, 1792.
 The Pennsylvania Mercury, and The Universal Advertiser. W., Apr. 7, 1775.
 The Pennsylvania Mercury, and Universal Advertiser. W., T.W., Aug. 20, 1784-July 19, 1791.
 The Pennsylvania Packet, and Daily Advertiser. D., Sept. 21, 1784-Dec. 31, 1790.
 The Pennsylvania Packet, and General Advertiser. T.W., Oct. 14, 1783-Sept. 18, 1784.

 The Pennsylvania Packet. and The General Advertiser. W., Oct. 28, 1771-Oct. 18, 1773.
 The Pennsylvania Packet, Or, The General Advertiser. T.W., S.W., July 4, 1778-Oct. 11, 1783.
 Pennsylvanische Fama, Oder, Ordentlicher Relation Derer Einlauffenden Neuigkeiten. W., Feb. 1748(?)-1751.
 Die Pennsylvanische Gazette, Oder, Der Allgemeine Americanische Zeitungs-Schreiber. W., Feb. 3, 1779.
 Pennsylvanische Staats-Courier. W., Oct. 4, 1777- June(?), 1778.
 The Philadelphia Aurora. T.W., Mar. 10-Nov. 5, 1800.
 The Philadelphia Gazette & Daily Advertiser. D., June 18- Dec. 31, 1800+
 The Philadelphia Gazette and Universal Daily Advertiser. D., Jan. 1, 1794-June 17, 1800.
 The Philadelphia Minerva. W., Feb. 7, 1795-July 7, 1798.
 The Philadelphia Price Current. B.W., Oct. (?), 1783- Nov. (?), 1785.
 Philadelphische Correspondenz. W., S.W., Nov. 27, 1792- April, 1800.

 Philadelphischer Zeitung. May 6, 1732-(?)
 Porcupine's Gazette. D., Apr. 24, 1797-Aug. 28, 1799.
 Porcupine's Gazette and United States Daily Advertiser. D., Mar. 4-Apr. 22, 1797.
 Poulson's American Daily Advertiser. D., Oct. 1, 1800+
 The Royal Pennsylvania Gazette. S.W., Mar. 3-May 26, 1778.
 Southwark Gazette, and Philadelphia Chronicle. T.W., July 15-Aug. 1, 1797.
 Story & Humphreys's Pennsylvania Mercury, and Universal Advertiser. W., Apr. 14-Dec. 22, 1775.
 The Supporter, Or, Daily Repast. D., W., Apr. 4 (?)- Nov. 10, 1800.
 The True American and Commercial Advertiser. D., July 2, 1798-Dec. 31, 1800+
 The Universal Gazette. Indexed. W., Nov. 16, 1797- Sept. 11, 1800.
 The Universal Instructor In All Arts and Sciences, and Pennsylvania Gazette. W., Dec. 24, 1728-Sept. 25, 1729.
 Der Wochentliche Philadelphische Staatsbote. W., Jan. 18, 1762-Dec. 28, 1767.
 Der Wochentliche Pennsylvanische Staatsbote. W., Jan. 5, 1768-May 16, 1775.

Pittsburgh
Newspapers published in Pittsburgh, Pennsylvania:

 The Pittsburgh Gazette. W., Jul. 29, 1786–Dec. (?), 1800+
 The Tree Of Liberty. W., Aug. 16, 1800+

Reading
Newspapers published in Reading, Pennsylvania:

 Neue Unpartheyische Readinger Zeitung, Und Anzeigs- Nachrichten. W., Feb. 18, 1789-Dec. 31, 1800+
 Der Unpartheyische Reading Adler. W., Nov.29, 1796- Jan. 10, 1797.
 Der Unpartheyische Readinger Adler. W., Jan. 17, 1797- Dec. 30, 1800+
 The Weekly Advertiser, Of Reading, In The County Of Berks. W., May 7, 1796-Dec. 27, 1800+

Washington
Newspapers published in Washington, Pennsylvania:

 Herald Of Liberty. W., Feb. 6, 1798-Dec. 31, 1800+

York
Newspapers published in York, Pennsylvania:

 The Pennsylvania Herald, and York General Advertiser. W., Jan. 7, 1789-Jan. (?), 1800.

See also
Media in Erie, Pennsylvania
Media of Philadelphia
Media in Pittsburgh
Adjoining states

References

Further reading
 
 "Bibliography of American Newspapers, 1690-1820 Part XII: Pennsylvania (A-N)" Proceedings of the American Antiquarian Society 30(1): 81-150. 1921
 "Bibliography of American Newspapers, 1690-1820 Part XIV: Pennsylvania (Pittsburgh to York)" Proceedings of the American Antiquarian Society 32(2): 346–379. 1923

External links

 . (Survey of local news existence and ownership in 21st century)

 
Pennsylvania

</noinclude>